State Route 219 (abbreviated SR 219) is part of Maine's system of numbered state highways, located in the western central part of the state.

SR 219 runs through parts of Oxford, Androscoggin and Kennebec counties.

Route description
SR 219 begins in the west at Greenwood Road in the town center of Greenwood.  From this intersection, SR 219 proceeds eastward and crosses into West Paris where it intersects with SR 26.  The two routes share a brief overlap before SR 219 continues northeast into Sumner.  The highway continues through the center of town and intersects with SR 140 just feet shy of the Nezinscot River.

SR 140 turns east along SR 219 and the two routes cross the river into Hartford.  After a  concurrency, SR 140 splits off to the north while SR 219 turns southeast and crosses into the northern part of Turner in Androscoggin County. SR 219 crosses SR 4 and intersects both the northern terminus of SR 117 and eastern terminus of SR 108 before crossing the Androscoggin River into Leeds. Continuing east, SR 219 intersects, and briefly overlaps with, SR 106 before crossing into Wayne and Kennebec County.  SR 219 meets its eastern terminus at SR 133 shortly thereafter, located near the northern tip of Androscoggin Lake.

History
A minor routing shift was made near Bear Pond in 1937–8; the highway, which once ran along the north side of the pond, now runs along the south side. The old routing is still present as unnumbered local roadways. By 1941, SR 219 had been extended westward along a concurrency with SR 140, then through entirely new routing through Sumner and West Paris to the current western terminus in Greenwood.

The first highway in Maine designated SR 219 ran between Rumford and South Arm north of Andover in 1928.   This is now the northernmost stretch of SR 5, although the route to South Arm was later truncated to what is now the intersection of SR 5 and SR 120 in Andover.

Major intersections

See also

References

219
Transportation in Oxford County, Maine
Transportation in Androscoggin County, Maine
Transportation in Kennebec County, Maine